Kumari Shyama Sharma (March 25, 1946 – September 21, 2020) was an Indian politician and revolutionary. She served as Minister of Law, Panchayati Raj, Food and Civil Supplies (1977–79), Chairperson of Public Accounts Committee (1982-84), Chairperson of Himachal Pradesh Finance Commission (1999), Chairperson of Himachal Planning Board (2000-2003)

She was born on March 25, 1947, in Village Saroga-Tikkar of Sirmaur. Her father, Pt. Durga Dutt, was the Landlord of erstwhile Sirmur State and was given the title of 'Rayees-e-aazam' by Maharaja of Sirmur. Shyama Sharma completed her Primary and Secondary Education from Rajmata Mandalsa Devi Kanya Vidyalaya (Government Girls School Nahan) and completed her LL.B. from DAV College Dehradun, Masters in Political Science from Allahabad University, Masters in Sociology from Agra University. After completing her education she started her career as an Advocate in District and Session Court Nahan.

While practicing law, she saw the plight of labourers working for Yamuna Hydel Project in Khodri Majri that they are not getting the wages for their work, Shyama led the mass movement of labourers. All the government hired labourers in North India came together demanding the formation of Wage Board for them. In the month of December 1974, Sirmaur Police arrived at Khodri Majri and tried to capture Shyama Sharma but she jumped into the Tons River and reached Jaunsar Babar by crossing the river in chilled night. From Jaunsar Bawar she moved towards Delhi where she remained underground for nearly one year. When National Emergency was declared in 1975, Shyama was arrested under MISA and kept in Central Jail Nahan nearly for a year. Shyama was the only female in Himachal who was arrested during National Emergency of 1975.

Political Career
In 1977, ten women were given ticket to contest Himachal Pradesh Assembly polls but nine women lost the election and only Shyama won the election with 71% of total votes of her Nahan Assembly constituency. She was then made Minister of Law, Panchayati Raj, Food and Civil Supplies in Government of Himachal Pradesh. In 1982 she again won assembly elections from Nahan and made Chairperson of Public Accounts Committee. At the same time she was the State President of Janta Party Himachal Unit. In 1990, Shyama Sharma for third time won election from Nahan. She was made National General Secretary of Janta Dal (S).

In 1991, Shyama was declared as a Lok Sabha candidate from Hoshiyarpur Lok Sabha Constituency. But due to some violence and terrorist attacks in Punjab, elections were cancelled. Then she was offered the post of Governor of Punjab by the then Prime Minister Chandrashekhar but she humbly declined the offer.

In 1996, Shyama joined Bhartiya Janta Party. In 1998, she was made Chairperson of Finance Commission of Himachal and in 1999, she was made Chairperson of Planning Board of Himachal Pradesh. Shyama was considered as 'Iron Lady of Himachal'.

In 2017, Shyama stepped down from active politics. On 21 September 2020, Shyama Sharma died from COVID-19 in Nahan constituency in Sirmaur district. She lived in a joint family along with her elder brother Sukh Dev Sharma who is a retired Excise and Taxation Inspector, elder sister Madhur Sharma who was married to a bureaucrat and younger brother Jai Dev Sharma who served in Home Guard Force. Shyama Sharma during her lifetime, took forward her elder brother's grandson Bhaavan Sharma into the field of social service. Currently, Bhaavan Sharma is the National President of Nav-Bharat Yuva Sangh.

References 

People from Sirmaur district
1950 births
2020 deaths
Bharatiya Janata Party politicians from Himachal Pradesh
Janata Party politicians
Janata Dal politicians
Deaths from the COVID-19 pandemic in India
Himachal Lokhit Party politicians
Women in Himachal Pradesh politics
21st-century Indian politicians
21st-century Indian women politicians
Himachal Pradesh MLAs 1977–1982
Himachal Pradesh MLAs 1982–1985
Himachal Pradesh MLAs 1990–1992